Paul Rutherford (born 14 February 1970) is a Scottish powerlifter. He is a Multiple World Powerlifting Champion.

Born in Glasgow, Scotland, he developed meningitis as an infant which severely affected his immune system and stunted his growth. As a result, he was short and very underweight as a child. Rutherford began weight training after being bullied at school. In 1985, aged 15, and at a body weight of only  he took up the sport of powerlifting.

He competed as junior lifter until 1989. The 5 ft 6in personal trainer won 11 championship titles from 1986 to 1990 but then retired.

In March 2007 he promised his nine-year-old son he would make an improbable comeback after watching the film Rocky Balboa, starring Sylvester Stallone, which was all about Rocky being older but making a ring comeback. In 2007 he achieved a silver medal at the European Powerlifting championships, and then bronze at the 2009 World Championships. In 2010 he finally achieved his dream of becoming World Powerlifting Champion at the age of 41. He again won the World Championships in 2011 2013 2015 2019 & 2021. His Daughter Hayley Rutherford and his son Ryan Rutherford have also won their respective divisions at the WDFPF World Championships.

Paul took 3 years away from competition between 2015 - 2018. He returned the international competition at the World Championships in 2018
achieving a silver medal. He again won his class at the 2019 World Championships held in Halle Germany. Between 2019 - 2021 Paul tore a thigh muscle and contracted Covid-19 twice which severely hampered his ability to exercise, However he Did manage to pick up his 6th world title in Castleblayney Ireland in November 2021.

Paul has been a Private Trainer and lifestyle management coach for nearly 30 years. His motto is "Keep it Simple" & "let your actions not your emotions guide you"

Career titles 
Scottish Champion 1986,1987,1988,1989,1990,2008,2010,2011
British Junior Champion 1989
British Masters Champion 2010,2011
British Champion 2014,2015,2018,2019
European Silver medallist 2007
World Bronze Medallist 2009
World Unequipped Champ  2010
World Equipped Champion 2011
World Equipped Champion 2013
World Equipped Champion 2015
World Equipped Champion 2019
World Equipped Champion 2021

References
 

http://www.paisleydailyexpress.co.uk/renfrewshire-sport/renfrewshire-sport-other-sport/2011/12/08/rutherfords-have-strong-family-ties-87085-29913298/
Paul is still going strong at 40, Paisley Daily Express
I told my boy I'd be a powerlift champ again after watching Rocky! Evening Times
Powerlifter Ruthy is the Rocky Balboa of Yorkhill Evening Times

External links
Official website

British Drug Free Powerlifting Federation
WORLD Drug Free Powerlifting Federation

British powerlifters
Sportspeople from Glasgow
1970 births
Living people